Leopold Kupelwieser (17 October 1796, Markt Piesting – 17 November 1862, Vienna) was an Austrian painter, often associated with the Nazarene movement.

Life
He was the son of Johann Baptist Georg Kilian Kupelwieser (1760–1813), co-owner of a factory that produced tableware. His talents were recognized at an early age by the sculptor Franz Anton von Zauner and by the time he was twelve, he was already attending the Academy of Fine Arts, Vienna.

During a stay in Rome in 1824, he came under the influence of Friedrich Overbeck and the Nazarene movement.

His brother was the theatrical director Joseph Kupelwieser, who wrote the libretto for Schubert's opera Fierrabras. With his brother, Joseph, he was a member of the "Schubertianer" (friends of Franz Schubert), a group that often got together for summers at the Schloss Atzenbrugg, west of Vienna. In 1826, Leopold married Maria Johanna Evangelista Augustina Stephania Theodora Lutz, an occasion which was marked by Schubert's composition, the "Kupelwieser Waltz" (never written down, but passed along by the family and later transcribed by Richard Strauss).

In 1837, he became Professor of history painting at the Academy and, in 1850, was awarded the Knight's Cross of the Order of Franz Joseph. Virtually all of his later work involved religious altarpieces and frescoes. At the age of sixty he fell ill, apparently due to the rigors of painting on wet lime, and never recovered his health.

Legacy
In 1894, a street was named in his honor and  a commemorative stamp was issued in 1996. He is a character in Das Dreimäderlhaus (House of the Three Girls, 1916), a pastiche operetta, derived from the music of Schubert by Heinrich Berté, based on the novel Schwammerl (Mushroom, one of Schubert's nicknames) by Rudolf Hans Bartsch. Kupelwieser is honoured in street names in his birthplace (Kupelwieserstraße in Markt Piesting), Kupelwiesergasse in Hietzing, Vienna and in the Austrian towns of Wiener Neustadt, St. Pölten and Atzenbrugg.

References

Further reading
 Constantin von Wurzbach: Kupelwieser, Leopold. In: Biographisches Lexikon des Kaiserthums Oesterreich, Vol. 13 (1865), pgs.392–396 (Fraktur)
 
 Rupert Feuchtmüller: Leopold Kupelwieser und die Kunst der österreichischen Spätromantik, Österreichischen Bundesvaerlag, 1970
 Rita Steblin: Die Unsinnsgesellschaft: Franz Schubert, Leopold Kupelwieser und ihr Freundeskreis, Vienna, Böhlau, 1998

External links

 The Waltz in G Flat Major (Kupelwieser Waltz) @ YouTube
 
 

19th-century Austrian painters
19th-century Austrian male artists
Austrian male painters
1796 births
1862 deaths
People from Wiener Neustadt-Land District
Nazarene painters